Saint-Chély-d'Aubrac (Languedocien: Sanch Èli d'Aubrac or Sench Eli d'Aubrac) is a commune in the Aveyron department in southern France about 7 kilometres from Aubrac.

Population

Location

The town is in a large and beautiful green valley on the GR 65, the Way of Saint James pilgrim route. When travelling on the long distance footpath, Saint Chély d'Aubrac is the next town after Aubrac. Going down a wild, wooded valley, the walker discovers this little town in a large clearing and comes into the town by the old bridge with its pilgrim's cross, like the pilgrims of the past.

The town of Saint-Chély-d'Aubrac is recognized by UNESCO as part of the Routes of Santiago de Compostela in France. The Bridge of the Pilgrims is specifically named as part of this designation.

Landscape
The town has been a member of the Natura 2000 network since August 2006. It hosts an annual chess festival.

Sights
 Jardin botanique d'Aubrac

Gallery

See also
Communes of the Aveyron department

References

External links

Way of Saint James
GR65
The pilgrims' bridge
Saint Chély photos
Aubrac's Cows
The little river of fair water for fishing
Official site
Way of Saint-James
Chemins de Grande Randonnée GR65
Picture site
Fishing site
Aubrac
Hiking in Saint-Chely d'Aubrac
Aubrac
Satellite viewer Zorgloob

Communes of Aveyron
World Heritage Sites in France
Aveyron communes articles needing translation from French Wikipedia